John Joe Cassidy was a Gaelic footballer who played for the Cavan county team.

Playing career
Cassidy was born and raised in Arva and got a taste of New York when he represented Cavan in the 1947 All-Ireland Senior Football Championship against Kerry in the Polo Grounds. He lined out at wing half forward in the 1948 and 1952 victorious finals. In the 1952 All-Ireland title success he scored a goal in the drawn game against Meath. Paul Fitzsimons was introduced as sub for John Joe Cassidy in the replay witch Cavan went on to celebrate a 0-9 to 0-5 win.  He also won six Ulster titles and two Railway Cup Medals.

Cassidy was top scorer in the 1952 Ulster Senior Football Championship, with a total of 1-7.

Later years
Cassidy emigrated to New York along with Owen Roe McGovern in the early 1950s and became an active member of the Cavan GFC of New York as a player, President and Honorary President, until his death in 1995.
John Cassidy has been a successful player in the travel industry and now classic resorts is a well known honeymoon tour operator.

References

Year of birth missing
1995 deaths
Cavan inter-county Gaelic footballers
Gaelic football backs
Gaelic games club administrators
Irish expatriate sportspeople in the United States